Korgoz (also, Kar’yery and Kërgëz) is a settlement and municipality in Baku, Azerbaijan.  It has a population of 2,558.

References 

Populated places in Baku